Zhouornis is an extinct genus of enantiornithine bird known from the Early Cretaceous Jehol Group (Aptian stage) of western Liaoning Province, northeastern China. Zhouornis was first named by Zihui Zhang, Luis M. Chiappe, Gang Han and Anusuya Chinsamy in 2013 and the type species is Zhouornis hani.

References

Enantiornitheans
Bird genera
Early Cretaceous birds of Asia
Fossil taxa described in 2013
Paleontology in Liaoning